Biker or bikie may refer to:

 A cyclist, a bicycle rider or participant in cycling sports
 A motorcyclist, any motorcycle rider or passenger, or participant in motorcycle sports
 A motorcycle club member, defined more narrowly than all motorcyclists
 An outlaw motorcycle club member, more narrowly than all motorcycle club members

See also
 
 
 
 
 Biker subculture (disambiguation)
 Byker, a district of Newcastle, England